Dr Judith Buckrich (born 1950, Budapest, Hungary) is a Melbourne author and past chair of the International PEN Women Writers' Committee. She is President of the PMI Victorian History Library (since 2018).

Life 
She emigrated to Australia with her parents in 1958. She has returned to Hungary several times and was working for the English-language Daily News during the 1989 velvet revolution. She is a consulting fellow of the World Innovation Foundation. In 2016 she won a Victorian Community History Award for her book The Village of Ripponlea published in 2015 and, in 2018, a Fellowship of Australian Writers (Victoria) Award for non-fiction for 'Acland Street: the Grand Lady of St Kilda' published in 2017.

Work 

She has several entries in the Encyclopedia of Melbourne, including those on Collins Street and St Kilda Road, and was an image researcher for the project. In her other writing life, she has written her own one-woman shows, short stories, feature articles. She has taught writing at Deakin University. Her most recent work is The World is One Kilometre: Greville Street, Prahran (2019).

She regularly speaks about her work on television and radio and has given talks at the National Gallery of Victoria, Royal Historical Society of Victoria and for many other organizations.

Her publishing house, Lauranton Books, has published three books, including the award winning 'The Village of Ripponlea'. In 2018 Lauranton Books will publish 'The Heart's Ground: A Life of Anne Elder' by Julia Hamer and an anthology of Anne Elder's poems, 'The Bright and the Cold'.

As of 2022, she was working on two histories, of the Victorian Pride Centre in St Kilda, Victoria, and of the Yarra River.

List of published works 

Buckrich, Judith (2019) Well Rowed University: Melbourne University Boat Club: The First 150 Years. Melbourne: MUBC.
Buckrich, Judith (2015). The Making of Us: Rusden Drama, Media and Dance 1966-2002. Lauranton Books. 
Buckrich, Judith (2015). The Village of Ripponlea. Lauranton Books.
Buckrich, Judith (2016). The Political is Personal: A 20th Century Memoir. Lauranton Books
Buckrich, Judith (2017). Acland Street: the Grand Lady of St Kilda (ATOM 2017)
Buckrich, Judith (2019). The World is One Kilometre: Greville Street, Prahran. Windsor, Victoria: Prahran Mechanics' Institute Press.
Buckrich, Judith (2020) Upstream, Against the Current: The Story of Women's Rowing in Australia, Lauranton Books with Rowing Australia

References

External links 
 Judith Buckrich's Website

1950 births
Living people
Writers from Melbourne
Australian women writers
Hungarian emigrants to Australia